Taku may refer to:

Places

North America
 the Taku River, in Alaska and British Columbia
 Fort Taku, also known as Fort Durham and as Taku, a former fort of the Hudson's Bay Company near the mouth of the Taku River
 the Taku Glacier, in Alaska near Juneau
 Taku Towers, in Alaska, near Juneau
 Taku Harbor, in Alaska, near Juneau
 Taku Inlet, in Alaska
 the Taku Plateau, in British Columbia
 Taku Arm of Tagish Lake in British Columbia
 Taku, British Columbia, a locality on Tagish Lake

Asia
 Taku Forts, forts on the south bank of the Hai He, in Tanggu District, Tianjin municipality, in northeastern China
 Taku, Saga, a city in Saga prefecture on the island of Kyūshū, Japan
 Taku, India, a town in India

Oceania 
 Taku, Kiribati, a village in Kiribati.

Peoples
 The Taku people, an Alaska Native group, who are a kwaan or tribe of the Tlingit
Taku River Tlingit First Nation, government in British Columbia

People

Surname 
 Moses Taku, a rabbi, 13th-century Tosafist from Bohemia
 Afrim Taku (born 1989), an Albanian soccer player
 Akwo Tarh Ayuk Taku (born 1992), Cameroonian soccer player

Nickname 
Ta-ku, an Australian musician
Taku, a nickname for Takuma Sato
 Taku, a nickname for people named Takudzwa, Takura or Takunda in the Shona language

Given name 
"Taku" is a Japanese male given name.
, Japanese footballer
, Japanese snowboarder
, Japanese footballer
, Japanese recording artist and percussionist for Fleetwood Mac
, Japanese screenwriter
Taku Morishita, Japanese shogi player
, Japanese freestyle skier
, Japanese basketball coach
Taku Sugimoto, Japanese guitarist
Taku Takahashi (born 1974), one half of the hip-hop duo M-Flo
, Japanese footballer
, Japanese footballer
, Japanese politician

Transportation
 HMS Taku (1900), the former German-built (at Schichau-Werke in 1898) Chinese destroyer Hai Lung captured by the British Navy at the Battle of Taku Forts on 17 June 1900 and added to the British Navy; she was sold in October 1916 to be scrapped
 HMS Taku (N38), a 1939 British T class submarine
 MV Taku, a 1963 vessel for the Alaska Marine Highway System
 USC&GS Taku, an 1898 United States Coast Guard and Geodetic Survey ship
 Taku Station, a railway station in Taku, Saga, Japan

Animals
 Taku (whale), an Orca (killer whale) that once lived at SeaWorld
 The Fijian name for the Hawksbill turtle

Other uses
 Battle of Taku Forts (disambiguation), several battles in China
 Takuu language or "Taku", a Polynesian language (ISO 639-3:nho)
 9574 Taku, an asteroid

See also
 Taku High School, in Taku, Saga, Japan
 Naka-Taku Station, a railway station in Taku, Saga, Japan
 Higashi-Taku Station, a railway station in Taku, Saga, Japan
 Takou, Burkina Faso, a village
 Takuu Atoll, sometimes written as "Takū"
 

Japanese masculine given names